The Thames-class lifeboat was operated by the Royal National Lifeboat Institution (RNLI) from its stations around the coasts of the United Kingdom between 1974 and 1997. Six were ordered but only two completed; they have both been sold on to other users.

The class takes its name from the River Thames which flows through London and into the North Sea.

History
In the 1960s the RNLI's fleet consisted of motor lifeboats of limited speed due to the shape of their hull. The United States Coast Guard (USCG) had developed a faster 44-foot motor lifeboat which planed across the water with a reduced contact area and therefore could move much faster. The RNLI obtained one in 1964. This led to the introduction of the  Waveney-class into service in 1967. The RNLI's architects designed a larger version with a longer hull and a bow of different shape. Six boats were ordered, four from Brooke Marine in Lowestoft and two from Richard Dunston in Hessle, but a cash-flow problem saw the project cancelled after just two of the Brooke Marine order had been built. Cancellation charges were paid as the builders had already ordered the necessary materials. Instead the alternative Arun-class lifeboat, which had first launched in 1971, went into full production.

Description
The Thames class had  steel hulls. They were powered by a pair of  General Motors diesel engines.

Fleet

RNLB Rotary Service (ON 1031)
This prototype Thames-class, RNLI Official Number (ON 1031) and Operational Number 50-001 was launched in 1973 and was named Rotary Service as its £200,000 price was funded by Rotary International. During this time it was used for 45 service calls and saved 17 lives. Its most meritorious service in this time was on 28 November 1977 when Coxswain Arthur West was awarded an RNLI Bronze Medal for his outstanding seamanship and tremendous courage in saving six men from a storm-lashed  barge. In 1979 it was reallocated to  where it was well liked. It was replaced in 1997 by brand new  .

After a few months in the relief fleet, Rotary Service was withdrawn from service. The following year it was sold and by 2008 was working as the pilot boat Treffry at Castletownbere in Ireland.

In 2015, the Thames Class Lifeboat Trust (later renamed the 50001 Youth Training Trust) purchased the Rotary Service for use as a training vessel. The Lowestoft-based charity teaches young and disadvantaged individuals seamanship skills to give them the confidence to take jobs in the maritime sector.

RNLB Helmut Schroder of Dunlossit (ON 1032)
The second Thames-class vessel was launched in 1976 and received the name Helmut Schroder of Dunlossit. It too was withdrawn in 1997 but the following year was sold for further use as a lifeboat. It was shipped to New Zealand where it was renamed P&O Nedlloyd Rescue and put into service with Sumner Lifeboat Institution Inc. It was sold to Lyttelton Port Company Ltd when replaced in 2010 by a new locally built Sumner-class lifeboat. It now serves as a LPC work boat and relief pilot boat named LPC Rescue.

The cancelled boats were to have been ON 1038-41, 50-003 to 50-006. These Official Numbers were not reallocated.

References

External links
 The 50001 Youth Training Trust

Royal National Lifeboat Institution lifeboats